The Estuary Ferry is a cable ferry in the Canadian province of Saskatchewan near the ghost town of Estuary. The ferry crosses the South Saskatchewan River, carrying Highway 741 across the river.

The six-car ferry is operated by the Saskatchewan Ministry of Highways and Infrastructure. The ferry is free of tolls and operates between 7:00 am and midnight, during the ice-free season.

The ferry typically carries 8000 vehicles each year.

See also 
List of crossings of the South Saskatchewan River
Transportation in Saskatchewan

References 

Chesterfield No. 261, Saskatchewan
Deer Forks No. 232, Saskatchewan
Ferries of Saskatchewan
Cable ferries in Canada